The Aberdeen Society of Architects (ASA) is a chapter of the Royal Incorporation of Architects in Scotland, and represents some 200 Chartered Architects in Aberdeen, Aberdeenshire and Moray.  ASA's main objective is to promote the interests of architects and architecture within its area.

History
ASA was founded in 1898 and its first president was James Souttar.

Society logo
The logo represents Aberdeen's Kings College Chapel, with its steeple in the form of an imperial crown. It is the only remaining building of the original college. Although the society was founded in 1898, the logo features the year 1916, in reference to the year in which chartered status was achieved.

Annual Design Awards 
The Society runs an annual awards programme, the ASA Design Awards, to recognise outstanding architecture in Aberdeen and Aberdeenshire.  Previous winners have included the Terrace Cafe and Bar at His Majesty's Theatre, Aberdeen (2023) and the Aberdeen Art Gallery (2020).

External links
Aberdeen Society of Architects website
Royal Incorporation of Architects in Scotland

1898 establishments in the United Kingdom
Royal Incorporation of Architects in Scotland
Professional associations based in Scotland
Architecture organisations based in the United Kingdom
History of Aberdeen
Organisations based in Aberdeen

References